Panic 5 Bravo is an action-thriller film directed by Kuno Becker about American paramedics that become trapped on the Mexican side of the border and terrorized by a violent psychopath. It was released in the U.S. by Pantelion Films.

Cast

 Kuno Becker as Alex
 Catherine Papile as Bobby
 Dan Rovzar as Josh
 Raul Mendez as Agustin
 Shalim Ortiz as Rafael
 Sofía Sisniega as Felicia

References

External links 
 

2013 films
2013 action thriller films
Films scored by Carlo Siliotto
Mexican action thriller films
2010s English-language films
2010s Mexican films